A cell in the context of electronic design automation (EDA) is an abstract representation of a component within a schematic diagram or physical layout of an electronic circuit in software. 

A cell-based design methodology is a technique that enables designers to analyze chip designs at varying levels of abstraction.  For example, one designer may focus on the logical function (high-level) and another may concentrate on physical implementation (low-level).  The technique also enables designers to reuse components in more complex designs without understanding all of the implementation details.

See also
Standard Cell
PCell
Integrated Circuits
Circuit Design

Electronic design automation